Wayd is a Slovakian progressive death metal band with jazz influence from Prešov, Slovakia.

Biography
The death metal band Wayd was founded in 1994 when thrash metal band MARION and death metal band DYSENTERY fused together. Both of them were just small bands known only in the regional underground scene as conventional metal bands. However, the very first beginnings of Wayd are connected with the effort to break the borders between the styles, as well as the effort to create more experimental and musically richer compositions.

Wayd was set up by Milan Savko (vocals and guitars), Braňo Kóša (drums), Richard Mayer (guitars) and Drahoš Juřík (bass guitar and vocals). Even though these four members stayed faithful to "Wayd", some small changes occurred in the line-up.

They mix the styles of jazz, death metal and progressive creating their music.

Current members
 Drahoš Juřík –bass, vocals
 Milan Savko – guitar, vocals
 Richard Majer – guitar
 Braňo Kóša – drums

Discography

Official releases 
 The Ultimate Passion 1997
 Barriers 2001
 Decadance 2003
 Ghostwalk 2007

Demo recording 
 Shape of Your Mind 1995

External links
 The official band site
 Myspace

Slovak heavy metal musical groups
Technical death metal musical groups
Musical groups established in 1994